Disakisperma is a genus of plants in the grass family, native to North and South America, Africa, and the Arabian Peninsula.

 Species
 Disakisperma dubium (Kunth) P.M.Peterson & N.Snow - Mexico, Honduras, South America (Bolivia, Brazil, Argentina, Peru, Ecuador, Colombia), United States (Arizona, New Mexico, Texas, Florida)
 Disakisperma eleusine (Nees) P.M.Peterson & N.Snow - South Africa, Mozambique, Lesotho, Eswatini, Namibia, Botswana 
 Disakisperma obtusiflorum (Hochst.) P.M.Peterson & N.Snow - Zaire, Burundi, Kenya, Uganda, Tanzania, Burundi, Angola, Sudan, South Sudan, Somalia, Ethiopia, Eritrea, Saudi Arabia, Yemen
 Disakisperma yemenicum (Schweinf.) P.M. Peterson & N. Snow -  Yemen, Eritrea

References

Chloridoideae
Poaceae genera